James M. Clancy was the Warden of Sing Sing prison during the July 1913 fire.

Biography
Clancy tried to resign in October 1913, then again in April 1914.

References

Wardens of Sing Sing
Year of birth missing
Year of death missing